Roberto Camarasa (born 1 August 1995 in  Rafelbunyol, Spain) is a Spanish footballer who plays for UD Puçol. He is the son of former Spain international "Paco" Camarasa.

Singapore
Placed in Geylang International of the Singaporean S.League's Prime League squad in mid-2016, Camarasa did not put in a torrid performance in any of his six appearances there, salvaging a goal in a 1–1 tie with DPMM in the 5th minute.

In the summer 2018, Camarasa joined UD Puçol.

References

External links
 at Footballdatbase.eu
 
 

Levante UD footballers
Spanish expatriate footballers
1995 births
Association football midfielders
Singapore Premier League players
Atlético Levante UD players
Spanish footballers
Living people
UD Alzira footballers
Geylang International FC players
Expatriate footballers in Singapore
Spanish expatriate sportspeople in Singapore